1935 Academy Awards may refer to:

 7th Academy Awards, the Academy Awards ceremony that took place in 1935
 8th Academy Awards, the 1936 ceremony honoring the best in film for 1935